Moore Lake is a lake in Alberta.

Municipal District of Bonnyville No. 87
Moore Lake